Twin Lakes is a census-designated place (CDP) in Santa Cruz County, California, United States. The population is at an estimated 5,378 as of 2016 which is up by 461 in 2010.

Geography
Twin Lakes is located at  (36.963450, -121.993498).

Twin Lakes also has Twin Lakes State Beach. It is a mile long beach popular for swimming and picnicking. It has some hiking trails, but it also known for stand-up paddle boarding, and other beach activities.

Demographics

2010
At the 2010 census Twin Lakes had a population of 4,917. The racial makeup of Twin Lakes was 3,900 (79.3%) White, 70 (1.4%) African American, 61 (1.2%) Native American, 126 (2.6%) Asian, 8 (0.2%) Pacific Islander, 534 (10.9%) from other races, and 218 (4.4%) from two or more races. Hispanic or Latino of any race were 1,109 persons (22.6%).

The census reported that 4,782 people (97.3% of the population) lived in households, 35 (0.7%) lived in non-institutionalized group quarters, and 100 (2.0%) were institutionalized.

There were 2,223 households, 463 (20.8%) had children under the age of 18 living in them, 669 (30.1%) were opposite-sex married couples living together, 232 (10.4%) had a female householder with no husband present, 102 (4.6%) had a male householder with no wife present.  There were 227 (10.2%) unmarried opposite-sex partnerships, and 21 (0.9%) same-sex married couples or partnerships. 813 households (36.6%) were one person and 274 (12.3%) had someone living alone who was 65 or older. The average household size was 2.15.  There were 1,003 families (45.1% of households); the average family size was 2.84.

The age distribution was 770 people (15.7%) under the age of 18, 651 people (13.2%) aged 18 to 24, 1,572 people (32.0%) aged 25 to 44, 1,220 people (24.8%) aged 45 to 64, and 704 people (14.3%) who were 65 or older.  The median age was 36.8 years. For every 100 females, there were 94.8 males.  For every 100 females age 18 and over, there were 91.4 males.

There were 2,741 housing units at an average density of 2,263.7 per square mile, of the occupied units 820 (36.9%) were owner-occupied and 1,403 (63.1%) were rented. The homeowner vacancy rate was 3.5%; the rental vacancy rate was 3.9%.  1,673 people (34.0% of the population) lived in owner-occupied housing units and 3,109 people (63.2%) lived in rental housing units.

2000
At the 2000 census there were 5,533 people, 2,409 households, and 1,038 families in the CDP. The racial makeup of the CDP was 78.84% White, 0.90% African American, 0.63% Native American, 2.30% Asian, 0.18% Pacific Islander, 12.43% from other races, and 4.72% from two or more races. Hispanic or Latino of any race were 22.54%.

Of the 2,409 households 21.3% had children under the age of 18 living with them, 30.1% were married couples living together, 8.4% had a female householder with no husband present, and 56.9% were non-families. 37.2% of households were one person and 12.7% were one person aged 65 or older.  The average household size was 2.24 and the average family size was 2.99.

The age distribution was 17.0% under the age of 18, 15.5% from 18 to 24, 35.7% from 25 to 44, 17.9% from 45 to 64, and 13.8% 65 or older.  The median age was 33 years. For every 100 females, there were 99.0 males.  For every 100 females age 18 and over, there were 96.9 males.

The median household income was $39,057 and the median family income  was $47,198. Males had a median income of $35,417 versus $31,538 for females. The per capita income for the CDP was $25,342.  About 7.5% of families and 14.9% of the population were below the poverty line, including 16.0% of those under age 18 and 3.5% of those age 65 or over.

Government

References

Census-designated places in Santa Cruz County, California
Census-designated places in California
Populated coastal places in California